Ithaca High School is a public high school located in Ithaca, Michigan, United States in central Gratiot County. Serving grades 7-12, it is part of the Ithaca Public Schools system and a member of the Tri-Valley West Athletic Conference.

Demographics
The demographic breakdown of the 624 students enrolled in 2013-14 was:
Male - 51.4%
Female - 48.6%
Native American/Alaskan - 0.8%
Asian/Pacific islanders - 0.6%
Black - 0.6%
Hispanic - 7.5%
White - 89.8%
Multiracial - 0.6%

32.9% of the students were eligible for free or reduced lunch.

Academics
Ithaca High School is accredited by the North Central Association.  Advanced Placement courses are offered in physics, biology, statistics, U.S. and world history and English literature.  Additional AP courses are available online through Michigan Virtual High School

Athletics
Ithaca is a member of the Tri-Valley West Athletic Conference, after leaving the Central State Activities Association prior to the 2006-07 school year.

Ithaca participates in the following sports:

Wrestling (boys only)
Basketball
American football (boys only) (State champions - 2010, 2011, 2012, 2013, 2015) 
Soccer
Baseball (boys only)
Softball (girls only)
Golf (Boys state champions - 1974)
Track and field (2016 State Champions - girls)
Cross country (Boys state champions - 1948 Girls state champions - 2014)
Cheerleading (girls only)
Bowling (Girls State Champions - 2016)
Volleyball (girls only)
Tennis

Ithaca's football team had a 69-game winning streak from 2010 to 2014.

Notable alumni
Curt Anderson - Christian pop musician
Chris Patrick - Former NFL and Canadian Football League player

References

External links
Ithaca High School official website

Public high schools in Michigan
Schools in Gratiot County, Michigan